The Dream class is a class of cruise ships, operated by Carnival Cruise Lines and Costa Cruises, The lead vessel of the class, entered service in September 2009.

The vessels design is an evolution from the  cruise ships. Notable additions in the designs are a half-mile exterior promenade on deck 5, with outside cafes, Jacuzzis situated along the edge of the promenade (on the Carnival trio), and an Aqua Park.

History 
The first Dream-class vessel, which was eventually named Carnival Dream, was ordered on December 14, 2005, from Italian shipbuilder Fincantieri. The four ships, and the options, were simultaneously ordered by Carnival Corporation for US$3 billion.

Carnival Dream then launched at Monfalcone on 24 October 2008. The ship was delivered on 17 September 2009, eleven  months after her launch, at the Monfalcone yards.

The option for a second vessel was exercised, which turned into Carnival Magic. The ship was ordered on 18 December 2006 and keel was then laid on 12 January 2010. The ship debuted on 1 May 2011.

The third ship was ordered 1 December 2009, which was named Carnival Breeze on 11 May 2010. She sailed on 3 June 2012.

Costa Cruises has ordered a ship of 132,500 GT,  in 2012, which is a fourth sister to this class.
Delivered on 25 October 2014, she sailed her inaugural cruise on 1 November, christened and began regular service on 8 November.

Ships

See also
List of cruise ship classes

References

External links 
 Carnival Cruise Lines page for Carnival Dream

Cruise ship classes
Carnival Cruise Lines